Adrián Marcelo Romero González (born June 25, 1977) is a retired Uruguayan football defender.

Club career
Romero started his playing career in 1999 with Cerro and in  2004 he joined Nacional.

Romero moved to Argentina in 2004 where he played with Estudiantes de La Plata and then Tiro Federal. In 2006, he returned to Uruguay to rejoin Nacional.

International career
Between 2003 and 2004 Romero played in 8 games for the Uruguay national team, on November 15, 2003, he scored the winning goal in a World Cup qualifier against Chile, and in the next game against Brazil on November 19 he was the captain of the Uruguayan team.

External links

 
  Profile at Tenfield

1977 births
Living people
Footballers from Montevideo
Uruguayan footballers
Association football defenders
Uruguayan expatriate footballers
Uruguay international footballers
C.A. Cerro players
Querétaro F.C. footballers
Club Olimpia footballers
Club Nacional de Football players
Estudiantes de La Plata footballers
Tiro Federal footballers
Cerro Largo F.C. players
Miramar Misiones players
Uruguayan expatriate sportspeople in Argentina
Uruguayan expatriate sportspeople in Mexico
Uruguayan expatriate sportspeople in Paraguay
Expatriate footballers in Argentina
Expatriate footballers in Mexico
Expatriate footballers in Paraguay
Uruguayan Primera División players
Argentine Primera División players
Liga MX players